Stefan Nedelchev Tsanev (born 7 August 1936) is a contemporary Bulgarian writer, known for his essays, plays, poems, and historical novels.

His books include Ubiytsite sa mezhdu nas (The killers are among us), and his plays, Istinskiyat Ivaylo (The true Ivaylo), which was banned.

Tsanev's latest four-volume work, Bulgarian Chronicles, uncovers previously hidden facts, added to the well-known, in Bulgaria's history: 2137 BC to the present.

References

1936 births
Living people
Bulgarian writers
People from Ruse, Bulgaria